Eugeniusz Koczorski (born 26 December 1956) is a Polish equestrian. He competed in two events at the 1988 Summer Olympics.

References

External links
 

1956 births
Living people
Polish male equestrians
Olympic equestrians of Poland
Equestrians at the 1988 Summer Olympics
People from Polkowice